This is the discography of Australian singer-songwriter Nick Cave, in addition to his career as lead singer of Nick Cave and the Bad Seeds, has released 1 studio album, 11 soundtrack albums, 1 extended play, 2 short soundtracks, 3 singles, 3 live albums, 1 compilation album. Since 2005, the majority of his work has been written & recorded in collaboration with Bad Seeds member and multi-instrumentalist Warren Ellis.

Studio

Albums

Soundtracks

EPs

Short soundtracks

Singles

Other appearances

Live

Albums 

 Live at Hammersmith Apollo (2015)
 Live at the Royal Albert Hall (2015)
 Idiot Prayer (Nick Cave Alone at Alexandra Palace) (2020)

Other appearances 

 Nick Cave i Przyjaciele (Nick Cave and Friends) (1999). A live tribute album by Polish musicians. Cave appears on "Into My Arms" and "The Weeping Song".
 "I'm Your Man" and "Suzanne" performed by Cave in the documentary/concert film Leonard Cohen: I'm Your Man (2006).
 The Harry Smith Project: Anthology of American Folk Music Revisited (2006), Concert album featuring Nick Cave performing "John the Revelator" and "Shine on Me".

Compilation 

 White Lunar, soundtrack compilation (2009) – composed with Ellis (2CDs). Disc one contains highlights from The Proposition, The Assassination of Jesse James by the Coward Robert Ford, and The Road. Disc 2 contains excerpts from unreleased soundtracks as well as four unreleased pieces from their archives.

Session work 

 Send Me a Lullaby (1981), album by The Go-Betweens, features Cave's vocals on "After the Fireworks".
 Burnin' the Ice (1982), album by Die Haut features Cave's vocals on "Stow-a-Way", "Truck Love", "Pleasure Is the Boss", "Dumb Europe".
 Annie Hogan Plays "Kickabye" EP (1985), features Cave's vocals and production on "Vixo". Recorded in October 1983.
 Oedipus Schmoedipus (1996), album by Barry Adamson, Cave appears on "The Sweetest Embrace".
 "Music for Expelling the Demon" (1999), a short animation by Devlin Crow, written by A-Soma.
 Punishing Kiss (2000), album by Ute Lemper, Cave co-wrote (with Bruno Pisek) "Little Water Song".
 Next Wave (2002), album by Chris Coco, Cave performs a cover version of The Velvet Underground's "Sunday Morning" with Chris Coco.
 American IV: The Man Comes Around (2003) duet with Johnny Cash on "I'm So Lonesome I Could Cry".
 Small World Big Band Friends 3 – Jack o the Green (2003), album by Jools Holland, "Kiss of Love" duet with Sam Brown.
 I Started Out with Nothin (2008), album by Seasick Steve, "Just Like a King" includes Cave's vocals.
 The Real Work (2022), album by Party Dozen, Cave features on "Macca the Mutt".

Unreleased soundtracks 

 The English Surgeon (2007) – excerpts released on White Lunar
 The Girls of Phnom Penh (2009) – excerpts released on White Lunar
 Lawless (2012) – "End Crawl" released on Lawless various artists album
 The Case Against Adnan Syed (2019) – unreleased

Compositions 
 To Have and to Hold (1996) – film score to John Hillcoat's film of the same name, with Blixa Bargeld and Mick Harvey.
 Woyzeck (2005) – theatre score composed with Warren Ellis
 The Metamorphosis (2006) – theatre score composed with Ellis
 Faust (2009) – theatre score composed with Ellis
 Shell Shock (2014) – opera with libretto by Cave
 L.I.T.A.N.I.E.S (2020) – opera with libretto by Cave

Readings 
 "The Atra Virago or the Vargus Barking Spider" (1987) – excerpt of And the Ass Saw the Angel, from Smack My Crack
 "And the Ass Saw the Angel" (1988) – further excerpts, released with Tender Prey
 The Secret Life of the Love Song & the Flesh Made Word: Two Lectures (2000)
 The Death of Bunny Munro (2009) – 7-disc audiobook, with backing music composed with Ellis

References 

Discographies of Australian artists
Rock music discographies